SSENSE (pronounced: "essence") is a multi-brand retailer based in Montreal, Canada specialising in the sale of designer fashion and high end streetwear. It was founded as an e-commerce platform in 2003 by three brothers: Rami, Bassel and Firas Atallah. The company delivers to 114 countries around the world and operates websites in Chinese，French, English, Japanese and Korean.

History 

SSENSE was founded in 2003 by brothers Firas, Rami and Bassel Atallah who were inspired to start an online fashion company by the experience of successfully selling a limited edition pair of Diesel jeans online. Their focus was on high-end brands, but their approach was consciously aimed at avoiding any snobbery or aloofness associated with luxury fashion and instead focusing on building an innovative platform to showcase a carefully selected set of products from brands that were chosen for their dedicated following. They also put a heavy emphasis on supporting smaller, emerging designers and brands.

In 2014 the founders of SSENSE were bestowed the Entrepreneur of the Year award by Ernst & Young. SSENSE was also named as one of the 30 leading global menswear retailers by Italian Prime Minister Matteo Renzi and The Business of Fashion.

In 2017 Rami Atallah was named Honorary Chair of the 2017 Canadian Arts and Fashion Awards. Rami Atallah was also named to the jury for the International Woolmark Prize competition alongside industry leaders.

In 2014, 2015, 2016 and 2017 Rami Atallah was named to The Business of Fashion BoF 500.

In 2018, SSENSE opened a flagship retail store in a historic 19th century building in Montreal turned into an experiential retail space by architecture firm David Chipperfield. the 5-story building within a building includes a cafe, art space and a floor dedicated to a personal-shopper-guided online-offline hybrid, which is accessible by appointment only.

On April 5, 2018, SSENSE acquired community-based fashion and art website Polyvore from Yahoo, immediately shutting it down.

In June 2021 SSENSE received minority investment from Sequoia Capital that valued the company at over $4 billion USD.

See also
YOOX Net-a-Porter Group
Clicks and mortar
Mytheresa
Farfetch
Elevenish

References

External links 
 

Online retailers of Canada
Retail companies established in 2003
Internet properties established in 2003
Clothing retailers of Canada